The Basilica of Our Lady of Mercy is a Baroque-style basilica in Barcelona, Catalonia.  It was built between 1765 and 1775, being the work of Catalan architect Josep Mas i Dordal. The dome of the church is crowned with a statue of Our Lady that is visible from the seaside promenade near the drassanes. This church was the second in Barcelona to receive the title of minor basilica, preceded only by the Barcelona Cathedral. The title was granted in 1918 by Pope Benedict XV, commemorating the seven hundredth anniversary of the apparition of the Virgin to St. Peter Nolasco, founder of the Order of Mercy.

References

Links
 www.basilicadelamerce.com Official web of Basilica of Our Lady of Mercy

Basilica churches in Spain
Roman Catholic churches in Barcelona
18th-century Roman Catholic church buildings in Spain
Baroque architecture in Barcelona
Roman Catholic churches completed in 1775